Gabara subnivosella, the wet sand savannah moth, is a moth in the family Erebidae. The species was first described by Francis Walker in 1866. It is found in North America from Manitoba south to Maryland, Massachusetts and New York.

The wingspan is about 25 mm.

Adults are extremely variable in colour and maculation (spots). The colour ranges from nearly white to dark grey and immaculate to specimens with a central nearly black streak across the width of the forewing.

External links
Line, Larry "Gabara subnivosella". Moths of Maryland. Retrieved May 19, 2020.

Scolecocampinae
Moths of North America